Johanita Scholtz (born 25 January 2000) is a South African badminton player. Scholtz won her first senior international title at the 2017 Botswana International tournament. She competed at the 2018 Commonwealth Games in Gold Coast, Australia. She was the women's singles gold medalist at the 2019 African Games, also won bronze medals in the team and women's doubles events.

Achievements

African Games 
Women's singles

Women's doubles

African Championships 
Women's singles

Women's doubles

BWF International Challenge/Series (9 titles, 5 runners-up) 
Women's singles

Women's doubles

Mixed doubles

  BWF International Challenge tournament
  BWF International Series tournament
  BWF Future Series tournament

References

External links 
 

Living people
2000 births
Sportspeople from Cape Town
South African female badminton players
Badminton players at the 2018 Commonwealth Games
Badminton players at the 2022 Commonwealth Games
Commonwealth Games competitors for South Africa
Competitors at the 2019 African Games
African Games gold medalists for South Africa
African Games bronze medalists for South Africa
African Games medalists in badminton
21st-century South African women